Khalilah is a super-yacht launched on the 25th of July 2014  at the Palmer Johnson shipyard in the United States and delivered later that year. The composite hull was built in Norway by Brødrene Aa. Both the interior and exterior design of Khalilah were done by an in house team of Palmer Johnson. A sistership is currently under construction.

She is available for charter.

Design 
The material used for the yacht is CFRP, which stand for carbon fiber reinforced plastic, with teak laid decks. The yacht has Det Norske Veritas (DNV) classification.

Engines 

See also 
 Luxury yacht
 List of motor yachts by length

References 

2014 ships
Motor yachts
Ships built in the United States